After the end of every competitive season, football clubs from Montenegro play in European competitions. 
Teams from Montenegro have been playing on the international scene since they represented SFR Yugoslavia during the 1970s. Since 2006, Montenegrin teams have played as representatives of independent Montenegro, and qualified through the Montenegrin First League and Montenegrin Cup.
Currently, four Montenegrin clubs take part in UEFA European Cups. The champion of the First Montenegrin League plays in UEFA Champions League qualifiers. The second and third placed team from the First League play in UEFA Europa Conference League qualifiers. The winner of the Montenegrin Cup also plays in the Europa Conference league.

UEFA Rankings

Current rankings (2022–23)
UEFA Country Ranking for league participation in 2022–23 European football season (Previous year rank in italics)
 51  (49)  Gibraltar National League
 52  (52)  Úrvalsdeild karla
 53  (50)  Montenegrin First League
 54  (54)  Primera Divisió
 55  (55)  Campionato Sammarinese di Calcio

History of rankings
Since independence (2006) and establishing of Montenegrin First League and other national competitions, Montenegro is a full-member of UEFA. Since then, Montenegrin League is present on UEFA Country Ranking system.
Below is a historical list of Montenegrin rankings and country coefficient.

Sources:

UEFA competitions

Performances by season
Historically, Montenegrin football clubs played in four UEFA competitions for clubs - the UEFA Champions League, UEFA Europa League (formerly UEFA Cup), UEFA Europa Conference League and Intertoto Cup.
The champions of Montenegro have never played in the group phase of the UEFA Champions League, and the most successful in the qualifiers was FK Zeta Golubovci in the 2007–08 season.
The best performances in the UEFA Europa League were FK Zeta who played in the playoffs, and OFK Titograd, FK Budućnost and FK Sutjeska which played in Round 3. The most successful in the Intertoto Cup was FK Budućnost Podgorica.
Below is a list of games of all Montenegrin clubs in UEFA competitions.

UEFA Champions League

UEFA Cup/Europa League

UEFA Europa Conference League

Intertoto Cup

Performances by clubs
12 different Montenegrin clubs have played in UEFA competitions. Before the founding of the Montenegrin First League and Montenegrin Cup, three clubs played in European Cups as a representatives of Yugoslavia / Serbia and Montenegro. Eight other clubs played their first seasons in UEFA competitions after Montenegrin independence.
Below is a table with Montenegrin clubs' scores in UEFA competitions.

As of the end of UEFA competitions 2020–21 season.

Performances by competition
Football clubs from Montenegro have played in three UEFA competitions. Below is a list of performances in every single competition.

As of the end of UEFA competitions 2021–22 season.

Scores by opponents' countries
Below is the list of performances of Montenegrin clubs against opponents in UEFA competitions by their countries (football federations).

As of the end of UEFA competitions 2021–22 season.

Other international competitions

Balkans Cup
The Balkans Cup was a regional football competition (1960-1994) in which Montenegrin clubs participated as a representatives of SFR Yugoslavia. Teams from Montenegro which played in the Balkans Cup were FK Budućnost Podgorica and FK Sutjeska Nikšić. FK Budućnost had the biggest success, playing in the 1991 final, after eliminating Galatasaray SK.
Below is a list of Montenegrin clubs in the Balkans Cup.

See also
Football in Montenegro
Montenegrin First League
Montenegrin Second League
Montenegrin Third League
Montenegrin Cup
Montenegrin clubs in Yugoslav football competitions (1946–2006)

References

Lists of Montenegrin football club seasons
Football in Serbia and Montenegro
Football in Montenegro
European football clubs in international competitions